Shameemul Haq is an Indian politician and a member of the 16th Legislative Assembly of Uttar Pradesh of India. He represents the Moradabad Rural constituency of Uttar Pradesh and is a member of the Samajwadi Party.

Early life and education
Shameemul Haq was born in Moradabad district, Uttar Pradesh. He has received education till 10th grade. Before being elected as MLA, he used to work as an agriculturist.

Political career
Shameemul Haq has been a MLA for two terms. During both his terms, he represented the Moradabad Rural constituency. During his first term (in 2002) he was a member of the Indian National Congress and  during his second term (2012) he was a member of the Samajwadi Party.

Posts Held

See also
Moradabad Rural
Politics of India
Sixteenth Legislative Assembly of Uttar Pradesh
Uttar Pradesh Legislative Assembly

References 

1955 births
Living people
People from Moradabad district
Samajwadi Party politicians
Uttar Pradesh MLAs 2002–2007
Uttar Pradesh MLAs 2012–2017